Jean-Charles Moïse (born 20 April 1967) is a Haitian politician. He is the Secretary General of the Pitit Desalin political party, and was a candidate for President of Haiti in 2015, and again in 2016, when the presidential elections were redone. He served 3 consecutive terms as the mayor of Milot (northern Haiti) and one term as Senator for the Nord Department, where he resigned with 2 years left on his mandate in protest to  some elected officials who tried to offered him $2.5 million bribe to stop his opposition against then President, Michel Martelly.

Biography 
Jean-Charles completed his studies at the National School of Milot and the Lycée Philippe Guerrier in Cap-Haïtien. He studied accounting science at Adventist University Diquini. He was the mayor of Milot (year unknown) and senator later during his life. In 2015, he resigned as Senator in order to run for the presidency. He received 14.22% of the popular vote, ranking 3rd, after Jovenel Moïse (PHTK) and Jude Célestin (LAPEH).

Politically, Jean-Charles describes himself as a "restorative socialist." His party's political platform for the 2016 election cited Jean-Jacques Dessalines and Fidel Castro as his primary and secondary philosophical and ideological influences, respectively. His political program is based on the three core tenets of sovereignty, solidarity, and prosperity.

During the Autumn 2022 wave of protests calling for the resignation of Ariel Henry and against Henry's request for foreign military invasion to keep him in power, Jean-Charles called on his followers to arm themselves with "machetes to lead the revolution."

Electoral records

Haitian presidential election, 2015:

References 

Candidates for President of Haiti
1967 births
Living people
People from Nord (Haitian department)
Members of the Senate (Haiti)